Mirov (from mir meaning world or peace) is a Russian masculine surname, its feminine counterpart is Mirova. It may refer to
Alexander Abramov-Mirov (1895–1937), Soviet Comintern communications officer and intelligence agent
Michael Mirov (1859–1923), Bulgarian Greek Catholic bishop

Russian-language surnames